Annihilation Principle is the fourth studio album by American thrash metal band Lȧȧz Rockit. It was released in 1989 on Roadrunner Records/Enigma Records and follows 1987's Know Your Enemy. It was itself followed by Nothing's Sacred, released in 1991. This is the final album featuring the classic line-up. Music video was filmed for the song "Fire in the Hole".

Track listing
All songs written by Lȧȧz Rockit, unless otherwise stated.

Note
The 2009 re-issue by Massacre Records contains a DVD of their 1988 performance at Dynamo Open Air in Eindhoven

Credits
 Michael Coons – vocals
 Phil Kettner – guitar
 Aaron Jellum – guitar
 Willy Lange – bass
 Victor Agnello – drums

Production
 Dave Plastic - Photography
 Jeff "Ski" Sadowski - Album concept, Cover art
 John Harrell - Photography
 Mark DeVito - Layout (re-created)
 Marc Reyburn - Engineering (assistant)
 Dwayne Cavanas - Photography
 Wayne Marsala - Producer (DVD)
 George Horn - Mastering
 William Hames - Photography
 Jeff Weller - Executive producer, Album concept
 Neil Zlozower - Photography
 Jodi Summers - Photography
 Gene Ambo - Photography
 Andre Verhuysen - Executive producer (DVD)
 Eric de Haas - Photography
 Ace Cook - Producer (DVD)
 Dave Luke - Mixing (assistant)
 Alex Solca - Photography
 Roy Rowland - Producer, Engineering, Mixing
 Juan Urteaga - Remastering
 Jay Ginnini - Photography
 Steve Gross - Design

References

External links
BNR Metal band page

1989 albums
Lȧȧz Rockit albums